Chiyoko (written: 千代子) is a feminine Japanese given name. Notable people with the name include:

, Japanese voice actress
Chiyoko Sakamoto (1912–1994), the first Japanese American female lawyer
, Japanese singer
Chiyoko Szlavnics (born 1967), a Canadian experimental composer 
Chiyoko Takahashi (1912–1994), American lawyer

See also
Chiyoko (camera manufacturer), a former name of the company which later became Minolta
Chiyoko Teruto (照門 千代子), a character in the manga Magical Trans!

Japanese feminine given names